Daniel Brocklebank (born 21 December 1979) is a British actor, best known for portraying the roles of Ivan Jones in the ITV soap opera Emmerdale (2005–2006), and Billy Mayhew in ITV's other long-running soap Coronation Street (2014–present). He is also known for his performance in the films Shakespeare in Love (1998), and The Hole (2001).

Career
From 1994, Brocklebank has starred in various TV programmes such as Down to Earth (BBC), Born and Bred (BBC), Ed Stone is Dead (BBC 3/Channel 4), Casualty (BBC), The Bill (ITV) and played Ivan Jones in ITV's Emmerdale between the beginning of 2005 to the end of 2006. Other TV credits include The Crazy World of Captain Llama, Fair City, Doctors and Waterloo Road. Brocklebank's other films include: The Hole starring opposite Keira Knightley and Thora Birch, The Hours opposite Meryl Streep, Another Life opposite Imelda Staunton and Tom Wilkinson, Merlin opposite Sam Neill and Helena Bonham Carter, The Devil's Arithmetic opposite Kirsten Dunst and Brittany Murphy, produced by Dustin Hoffman and The Criminal with Eddie Izzard.

Brocklebank has worked with the Royal Shakespeare Company in productions of As You Like It playing Silvius, Chiron inTitus Andronicus, Rowland in The Tamer Tamed and Ralph in Lord of the Flies. His other theatre credits include Martin Von Heilmann in The Curse of the Werewolf at the Union Theatre in London, John Rutherford in Rutherford and Son at the Royal Exchange in Manchester and John Honyman in Cressida, directed by Nicholas Hytner for the Almeida Theatre in London's West End. Among other projects in 2008, Brocklebank starred in One Night In November, a new play by Alan Pollock directed by Hamish Glenn at the Belgrade Theatre, and in Big Love at the Abbey Theatre, Dublin, directed by Selina Cartmell.

In 2009, he played Brother Jasper and Kaisa in His Dark Materials, a co-production between the Birmingham Rep and the West Yorkshire Playhouse directed by Rachel Kavanaugh and Sarah Esdaile. In 2009, he completed filming Release, a British feature film, written by Christian Martin and Darren Flaxstone of FAQ's LTD in which he plays the lead role of Father Jack Gillie. In 2010, Brocklebank starred in one of three new dark tales Little Deaths directed by Andrew Parkinson, whose previous projects include I, Zombie, Dead Creatures and Venus Drowning. He also  completed Age of Heroes, in which he plays Sergeant Hamilton, a small role, opposite Danny Dyer and Sean Bean.

In December 2014, he joined the cast of Coronation Street as Billy Mayhew, the new vicar at Emily Bishop's parish, St. Mary's, and began dating the barman Sean Tully. He appears as Carl Saunders in the second (2014) and third (2015) series of the BBC's WPC 56. Brocklebank has played roles in other films such as Admiral, a movie where he plays opposite Charles Dance; Soft Lad, a movie written and directed by Leon Lopez; and Native, playing opposite Rupert Graves and Ellie Kendrick.

Personal life
Brocklebank is gay. In a 2021 interview with Attitude, Brocklebank shared, “I pretend for a living, I didn’t want to pretend in my private life. When you spend your life on screen, it’s important to hold on to the bits that are real. Who I am in my real life should bear no relevance to what I play on screen [...] I remember my management in Los Angeles trying to convince me not to come out because they said it would affect work – and it did [...] I stopped being screen-tested for the heterosexual male leads and I was either the gay best friend or the character parts."

Filmography

Theatre
Lord of the Flies (Ralph) (1995) RSC
Mensch Mier (Ludwig) (1996) Leicester Haymarket
The Tamer Tamed (Rowland) (2003–2004) RSC
Titus Andronicus (Chiron) (2003) RSC
As you like it (Silvius) (2003) RSC
Cressida (John Honyman) (2000) Almeida in the West End
His Dark Materials (Brother Jasper) (2009) Birmingham Rep

References

External links 
 
 

1979 births
Living people
English male child actors
English male film actors
English male stage actors
British male stage actors
English male radio actors
English male soap opera actors
English male Shakespearean actors
Royal Shakespeare Company members
People from Muswell Hill
Male actors from Warwickshire
People educated at Redroofs Theatre School
English gay actors
English LGBT actors
20th-century English LGBT people
21st-century English LGBT people